Krisztián Futaki (born 2 February 1979 in Békéscsaba) is a Hungarian football (defender) player who currently plays for Békéscsaba 1912 Előre SE.

External links
HLSZ 
MLSZ 

1979 births
Living people
People from Békéscsaba
Hungarian footballers
Association football defenders
Békéscsaba 1912 Előre footballers
Orosháza FC players
Gyulai Termál FC players
Sportspeople from Békés County